Dario Allevi (born 30 September 1965 in Rome) is an Italian politician.

He is a member of the centre-right party Forza Italia. He served as first President of the Province of Monza and Brianza from 2009 to 2014. Allevi was elected Mayor of Monza on 12 June 2017 and took office on 26 June, holding office till 28 June 2022.

See also
2017 Italian local elections
List of mayors of Monza

References

External links
 

1965 births
Living people
Mayors of Monza
People from Monza
Forza Italia (2013) politicians
Presidents of the Province of Monza and Brianza